The Museum of World Religions (MWR) is a museum in Yonghe District, New Taipei, Taiwan.

History
The museum was founded in November 2001 by Venerable Hsin Tao (心道), a Buddhist monk, and set up through the Ling Jiou Mountain Buddhist Foundation. Further elaborate opening ceremonies were held in September and November 2002 with many religious leaders and others from around the world, including the President Chen Shui-bian. The Taiwanese architect and educator Han Pao-teh was the first curator. In February 2003, an interactive multimedia was installed at the Hall of Life Travel.

Architecture
The museum building was designed by Ralph Appelbaum Associates, the designer of major American museums including the United States Holocaust Memorial Museum in Washington DC and the expansion of the Hayden Planetarium at the American Museum of Natural History in New York City.

Exhibitions
The museum presents exhibits on ten different major world religions. It also features a model called "Avatamsaka World" illustrating the Avatamsaka Sutra.

Transportation
The museum is accessible within walking distance North West from Yongan Market Station of the Taipei Metro.

See also 
 List of museums in Taiwan
 Buddhism in Taiwan

References

External links 

 

2001 establishments in Taiwan
Museums established in 2001
Museums in New Taipei
Religious museums
Religion in Taiwan